Hulme Hall is the name of a number of buildings. It may refer to:

Hulme Hall, Allostock
Hulme Hall, Hulme
Hulme Hall, Manchester
Hulme Hall, Port Sunlight
Hulme Hall, Reddish

It may also refer to the grammar school:

Hulme Hall Grammar School

Architectural disambiguation pages